The 2003 PGA Tour season was played from January 9 to November 9. The season consisted of 48 official money events. Tiger Woods won the most tournaments, five, and there were seven first-time winners. Two notable first-time winners occurred at majors, with Ben Curtis winning The Open after starting the week ranked 396th and Shaun Micheel's first and only PGA Tour win at the PGA Championship. The tournament results, leaders, and award winners are listed below.

Schedule
The following table lists official events during the 2003 season.

Unofficial events
The following events were sanctioned by the PGA Tour, but did not carry official money, nor were wins official.

Location of tournaments

Money leaders
The money list was based on prize money won during the season, calculated in U.S. dollars.

Awards

Notes

References

External links
PGA Tour official site

PGA Tour seasons
PGA Tour